Njalla Quan Sports Academy, or NQSA, is a football club in Cameroon. The academy was founded by Mr. Henry Njalla Quan on 15 September 2000.
They currently play in the top-flight football league of Cameroon ( MTN Elite One ).
Stade Municipal de Limbé is their home stadium, with a capacity of 12,000.

External links

 NQSA logo
Official Website: nqs-academy.com

Football clubs in Cameroon
Sports clubs in Cameroon